Hugo André Viriato Santos Gomes (born 11 October 1979 in Faro, Algarve) is a Portuguese former professional footballer who played as a right back.

External links

1979 births
Living people
People from Faro, Portugal
Portuguese footballers
Association football defenders
Primeira Liga players
Liga Portugal 2 players
Segunda Divisão players
S.C. Farense players
C.D. Beja players
Juventude Sport Clube players
S.R. Almancilense players
C.F. Estrela da Amadora players
U.D. Leiria players
C.F. União players
Portimonense S.C. players
Portugal youth international footballers
Sportspeople from Faro District